Andrei Dmitriyevich Linde (born March 2, 1948) is a Russian-American theoretical physicist and the Harald Trap Friis Professor of Physics at Stanford University.

Linde is one of the main authors of the inflationary universe theory, as well as the theory of eternal inflation and inflationary multiverse. He received his Bachelor of Science degree from Moscow State University. In 1975, Linde was awarded a PhD from the Lebedev Physical Institute in Moscow. He worked at CERN (European Organization for Nuclear Research) since 1989 and moved to the United States in 1990, where he became professor of physics at Stanford University. Among the various awards he has received for his work on inflation, in 2002 he was awarded the Dirac Medal, along with Alan Guth of MIT and Paul Steinhardt of Princeton University. In 2004 he received, along with Alan Guth, the Gruber Prize in Cosmology for the development of inflationary cosmology. In 2012 he, along with Alan Guth, was an inaugural awardee of the Fundamental Physics Prize. In 2014 he received the Kavli Prize in Astrophysics  "for pioneering the theory of cosmic inflation", together with Alan Guth and Alexei Starobinsky. In 2018 he received the Gamow Prize.

Cosmological phase transitions and old inflation 

During 1972 to 1976, David Kirzhnits and Andrei Linde developed a theory of cosmological phase transitions. According to this theory, there was not much difference between weak, strong and electromagnetic interactions in the very early universe. These interactions became different from each other only gradually,  after the cosmological phase transitions which happened when the temperature in the expanding Universe's became sufficiently small.  In 1974, Linde found that the energy density of scalar fields that break the symmetry between different interactions can play the role of the vacuum energy density (the cosmological constant) in the Einstein equations. Between 1976 and 1978, Linde demonstrated that the release of this energy during the cosmological phase transitions may be sufficient to heat up the universe.

These observations became the main ingredients of the first version of the inflationary universe theory proposed by Alan Guth in 1980. This theory, now called the "Old inflation theory", was based on the assumption that the universe was initially hot. It then experienced the cosmological phase transitions and was temporarily stuck in a supercooled metastable vacuum state (a false vacuum). The universe then expanded exponentially – "inflated" – until the false vacuum decayed and the universe became hot again. This idea attracted much attention because it could provide a unique solution to many difficult problems of the standard Big Bang theory. In particular, it could explain why the universe is so large and so uniform. However, as Guth immediately realized, this scenario did not quite work as intended: the decay of the false vacuum would make the universe extremely inhomogeneous.

New inflation 

In 1981, during a seminar by  Stephen Hawking on quantum gravity , Linde developed another version of inflationary theory which he called "New inflation".  He demonstrated  that the bubbles not joining up (see page 138 of A Brief History of Time, Chapter 8)  could be solved if there was  a bubble that contained our  region of  the universe in it. He also said that the phase transition  must have taken place slowly inside the bubble. This theory resolved the problems of the original model proposed by Guth while preserving most of its attractive features. A few months later, a similar scenario was proposed by Andreas Albrecht and Paul Steinhardt which referenced Linde's paper. Soon after that, it was realized that the new inflationary scenario also suffered from some problems. Most of them arose because of the standard assumption that the early universe initially was very hot, and inflation occurred during the cosmological phase transitions.

Chaotic inflation 

In 1983, Linde abandoned some of the key principles of old and new inflation and proposed a more general inflationary theory, chaotic inflation. Chaotic inflation occurs in a much broader class of theories, without any need for the assumption of initial thermal equilibrium. The basic principles of this scenario became incorporated in most of the presently existing realistic versions of inflationary theory.  Chaotic inflation changed the way we think about the beginning of inflation. Later on, Linde also proposed a possible modification of the way in which inflation may end, by developing the hybrid inflation scenario. In that model, inflation ends due to the "waterfall" instability .

Creation of matter in the universe 

According to the inflationary theory, all elementary particles in the universe emerged after the end of inflation, in a process called reheating. The first version of the theory of reheating, which is essentially the theory of creation of matter in the universe, was developed in 1982 by Alexander Dolgov and Linde, and also by L.F. Abbott, Edward Farhi and Mark B. Wise. In 1994, this theory was revised by L.A. Kofman, Linde and Alexei Starobinsky. They have shown that the process of creation of matter after inflation may be much more efficient due to the effect of parametric resonance.

Inflationary multiverse and eternal chaotic inflation

Perhaps the most far-reaching prediction made by Linde was related to what is now called the theory of inflationary multiverse, or string theory landscape. In 1982-1983, Steinhardt, Linde and Alexander Vilenkin realized that exponential expansion in the new inflation scenario, once it begins, continues without end in some parts of the universe. On the basis of this scenario, Linde proposed a model of a self-reproducing inflationary universe consisting of different parts. These parts are exponentially large and uniform, because of inflation. Therefore, for all practical purposes each of these parts looks like a separate mini-universe, or pocket universe, independent of what happens in other parts of the universe.

Inhabitants of each of these parts might think that the universe everywhere looks the same, and masses of elementary particles, as well as the laws of their interactions, must be the same all over the world. However, in the context of inflationary cosmology, different pocket universes may have different laws of low-energy physics operating in each of them. Thus our world, instead of being a single spherically symmetric expanding balloon, becomes a huge fractal, an inflationary multiverse consisting of many different pocket universes with different properties. This provided a simple scientific interpretation of the cosmological anthropic principle: Our world may consist of different parts, but we can live only in those parts of the multiverse which can support life as we know it.

These ideas did not attract much attention at that time, in part because the anthropic principle was very unpopular, in part because the new inflationary scenario did not quite work and was replaced by the chaotic inflation scenario. However, in 1986 Linde found that in many versions of the chaotic inflation scenario, the process of exponential expansion of the universe also continues forever in some parts of the universe. Linde called this process eternal inflation. Quantum fluctuations produced during eternal chaotic inflation are so large that they can easily push different parts of the universe from one vacuum state to another, and even change the effective dimensionality of spacetime. This provided a very powerful realization of the theory of the multiverse.

Linde and his Stanford colleague Vitaly Vanchurin calculated the number of all possible universes, to be about 10^10^16 if we do not consider the fact that humans as observers are limited in their ability to distinguish more universes. If this is taken into account, there could be as many as 10^10^10^7 universes. By analyzing the slow-roll inflation mechanism that initially generated the quantum fluctuations, the scientists could estimate the number of resulting universes at 10^10^10^7.

Inflation and string theory 

A significant advance in this area was obtained when the theory of inflationary multiverse was implemented in the context of string theory. In 2000, Raphael Bousso and Joseph Polchinski proposed using the regime of eternal inflation and transitions between many different vacua in string theory for solving the cosmological constant problem. At that time, no stable or metastable vacua of string theory were actually known. A possible mechanism of string theory vacuum stabilization was proposed in 2003 by Shamit Kachru, Renata Kallosh, Linde, and Sandip Trivedi, who also found that all of these vacua describing expanding universe are metastable, i.e. they must eventually decay (see KKLT mechanism). Then Michael R. Douglas and his collaborators  estimated that the total number of different stringy vacua can be as large as 10500, or even more,  and Leonard Susskind developed the string theory landscape scenario based on investigation of cosmological phase transitions between different string theory vacua.

One of the main challenges of this theory is to find the probability of living in each of these different parts of the universe. However, once string theory is invoked, it is extremely difficult to return to the previous picture of a single universe. In order to do so, one would need to prove that only one of the many vacua of string theory is actually possible, and to propose an alternative solution of the many problems which can be solved by using the anthropic cosmological principle in the context of the theory of inflationary multiverse.,

Linde  continues his work on the theory of inflationary multiverse. In particular, Renata Kallosh and  Andrei Linde, together with their collaborators, developed a theory of cosmological attractors. This is a broad class of versions of inflationary cosmology which provide one of the best fits to the latest observational data.

Honors and awards 

In July 2012, Linde was an inaugural awardee of the Fundamental Physics Prize, the creation of physicist and internet entrepreneur Yuri Milner. In 2014, he was a co-recipient, with Alan Guth and Alexei Starobinsky, of the Kavli Prize awarded by the Norwegian Academy of Science and Letters.

Linde is a member of the National Academy of Sciences and of the American Academy of Arts and Sciences.

Personal life 

Linde is married to Renata Kallosh. They have two sons.

Political positions 
In February–March 2022, he signed an open letter by Russian scientists condemning the 2022 Russian invasion of Ukraine, and another open letter by Breakthrough Prize laureates with the same message.

References

External links 
 Andrei Linde's webpage at Stanford University
 
 
 Andre Linde radio interview on Entitled Opinions
 Linde, Andrei (2004) "Inflation, Quantum Cosmology and the Anthropic Principle" in John Barrow, Paul C W Davies, and C L Harper, eds., Science and Ultimate Reality: From Quantum to Cosmos, a volume honoring John A. Wheeler's 90th birthday. Cambridge University Press.
 Slack, Gordy (1998) "Faith in the Universe: Conversations with cosmologists," California Wild 51(3)

1948 births
Living people
Moscow State University alumni
American cosmologists
Soviet emigrants to the United States
Soviet physicists
20th-century American physicists
People associated with CERN
Russian activists against the 2022 Russian invasion of Ukraine
Members of the Norwegian Academy of Science and Letters
Kavli Prize laureates in Astrophysics